Manulis is a surname.

John Bard Manulis
Martin Manulis